State Highway 54 (SH-54) is a  state highway in Idaho from SH-41 to near Bayview.

Route description
SH-54 begins at an intersection with SH-41 in the town of Spirit Lake. The route travels east out of the town, passing by Timberlake High School. SH-54 enters the city of Athol briefly, intersecting with US 95. At Smylie Boulevard, the road continues east, turning northeast at a circular intersection with Good Hope Road, where it enters Farragut State Park. SH-54 continues near Lake Pend Oreille, where it turns north into the town of Bayview. The road makes a brief turn to the east before terminating at Main Street on the shores of Scenic Bay.

Junction list

References

054
Transportation in Kootenai County, Idaho